Paul Leopold Rosenfeld (May 4, 1890 – July 21, 1946) was an American journalist, best known as a music critic.

Biography
He was born in New York City into a German-Jewish family, the son of Clara (née Liebmann) and Julius Rosenfield. His mother was the granddaughter of brewer Samuel Liebmann. He studied at Riverview Military Academy, Poughkeepsie, and Yale University, graduating in 1912.

After further education at the Columbia University Graduate School of Journalism, he became a prolific journalist, writing on literature and art as well as music. He was one of the Alfred Stieglitz circle, and favoured an intellectually heavyweight and quite European approach. His friend Edmund Wilson, writing two years after Rosenfeld's death, expressed the thought that his articles had become too uncompromising for the public taste, as time went by. Wilson's tribute was republished in his own book Classics and Commercials in 1950.

Magazines which published Rosenfeld's writing included The New Republic, Seven Arts, Vanity Fair magazine, The Nation, The Dial and Modern Music.  He edited Seven Arts from 1916 to 1918, and was an editor of the American Caravan yearbooks.

The Boy in the Sun (1928) was an autobiographical novel.

References

External links
 
 
 
 Paul Rosenfeld Papers. Yale Collection of American Literature, Beinecke Rare Book and Manuscript Library.

1890 births
1946 deaths
American male journalists
Jewish American journalists
American music critics
American music journalists
20th-century American novelists
American male novelists
American people of German-Jewish descent
Columbia University Graduate School of Journalism alumni
20th-century American male writers
Liebmann family
20th-century American non-fiction writers
20th-century American Jews